Rogelio Reyes (born 1 April 1942) is a Mexican boxer. He competed in the men's light welterweight event at the 1960 Summer Olympics.

References

1942 births
Living people
Mexican male boxers
Olympic boxers of Mexico
Boxers at the 1960 Summer Olympics
Sportspeople from Tampico, Tamaulipas
Light-welterweight boxers